The William Culmer House, at 33 C St. in Salt Lake City, Utah, United States, was built in 1881.  It was built for William Culmer, a successful businessman who had immigrated from England.  It was listed on the National Register of Historic Places in 1974.

It currently serves as the Sacred Heart Center of the Roman Catholic Diocese of Salt Lake City.

References

External links

 

Houses completed in 1881
Houses in Salt Lake City
Houses on the National Register of Historic Places in Utah
Historic American Buildings Survey in Utah
1881 establishments in Utah Territory
National Register of Historic Places in Salt Lake City